Karel Holý (born 3 February 1956) is a Czech former professional ice hockey forward.

Holý played the majority of his career with HC Sparta Praha, from 1974 to 1978 and again from 1980 to 1986. He also played for HC Dukla Jihlava as well as in Germany's Eishockey-Bundesliga for ESV Kaufbeuren and in Finland's II-divisioona for IPK.

Holý was also a member of the Czechoslovakia national team. He competed in the men's tournament at the 1980 Winter Olympics.

References

External links

1956 births
Living people
Czech ice hockey forwards
HC Dukla Jihlava players
Iisalmen Peli-Karhut players
ESV Kaufbeuren players
HC Sparta Praha players
Olympic ice hockey players of Czechoslovakia
Ice hockey players at the 1980 Winter Olympics
Ice hockey people from Prague
Czechoslovak expatriate sportspeople in Finland
Czechoslovak expatriate sportspeople in West Germany
Czechoslovak expatriate ice hockey people
Expatriate ice hockey players in West Germany
Expatriate ice hockey players in Finland
Czechoslovak ice hockey forwards
Czechoslovakia (WHA) players